Quenuaorco (possibly from Quechua kinwa quinoa, urqu mountain, "quinoa mountain") is a mountain in the northwestern part of the Vilcabamba mountain range in the Andes of Peru, about  high. It is situated in the Cusco Region, La Convención Province, Vilcabamba District. Quenuaorco lies northeast of Choquesafra and the Panta group, and northwest of Choquetacarpo. The nearest town is Vilcabamba northeast of the mountain.

References

Mountains of Peru
Mountains of Cusco Region